Utlängan is an island in the Karlskrona archipelago in Blekinge, Sweden.

Geography
The island is situated the furthest out to sea of any of the archipelago's islands. Only the rock of Utklippan is situated further out. The island covers just over 215 hectares (530 acres). Utlängans harbour, called Stenshamn, is an island in its own right and is linked by bridge to Utlängan proper. Utlängan features a tall observation tower which was once used by the Swedish military. The island also has a lighthouse, which is found to the south. A ferry service from Torhamn links the island to the Swedish mainland.

History
The island was the starting point of a medieval sailing route to Estonia, known today as King Valdemar's sailing route.

References
This article is based on the Swedish Utlängan article

Swedish islands in the Baltic
Islands of Blekinge County